The Eton Boys or The Four Eton Boys were an all-male quartet whose members were Earl Smith, tenor; Art Gentry, 2nd tenor; Charles Day, baritone; and Jack Day, bass. They featured in Screen Songs films during the 1930s, appearing in short films (including as the musical accompaniment to animated films) and on popular radio shows. They went to schools in the St. Louis area, and the original two performed first as acrobats.

In 1941 they recorded on Victor Records. Castle Films released an album of their soundies.

Trivia
Art Gentry is the grandfather of television personality Matt Lauer.

Filmography
Frances Shelley and the Four Eton Boys (1929)
The Operator's Opera (1933)
Use Your Imagination (1933)
Sing 'Em Back Alive (1933)
Moonlight and Pretzels (1933)
I Like Mountain Music (1933) Screen Songs
Down by the Old Mill Stream (1933) Screen Songs
Mirrors (1934), a short
The Gem of the Ocean (1934)A Great Idea (1935)Rhythm Café (1938)A Bicycle Built for Two (1941)My Gal Sal''

References

External links
Eton Boys IMDb page
Videos of their performances Fleischer All Stars

American jazz musicians
Vocal quartets